The Western River Railroad (reporting mark WRR) is a  narrow gauge rail transport attraction in Tokyo Disneyland, which opened on April 15, 1983.

Overview
Sponsored by Takara Tomy, the Western River Railroad is one of two rail attractions at Tokyo Disney Resort, the other being the DisneySea Electric Railway at Tokyo DisneySea. It differs from other Disney railroad attractions in that it does not circle the whole park. Additionally, this railroad has a track gauge is  narrow gauge as compared with other Disney railroad track gauges of  narrow gauge.

At the time that the Western River Railroad was opened, Japanese rail regulations required that any railway line with more than one stop be subject to the same rules as any other conventional rail line, which included running on a timetable and collecting fares; this law was later abolished on April 1, 1987. As such, there is only one stop on the Western River Railroad in order to avoid having to charge fares and to allow the use of passenger cars that are not fully enclosed, which would not be allowed otherwise.

Ride experience
Going clockwise around the loop, the train departs Adventureland Station, and passes through Stillwater Junction, a Western-themed train station (though the train does not stop here). Afterwards, the train goes through a forest where passengers are able to see animatronic displays of wild animals and Native Americans. Continuing down the line, the train crosses over a long trestle through the Critter Country section and the Big Thunder Mountain Railroad attraction in the Westernland section. Finally, it enters through a deep tunnel containing the Primeval World Diorama (featuring animatronic dinosaurs) and exits back to the Adventureland Station.

Rolling stock

The Western River Railroad has four  narrow gauge 2-4-0 steam locomotives built by Kyosan Kogyo Co., which were named after famous rivers located primarily in the Western United States (hence the name of the railroad). All four locomotives were designed to resemble the Denver & Rio Grande Montezuma locomotive, which was built by Baldwin Locomotive Works.

The railroad also has a fleet of twelve passenger cars, with three coaches assigned to each locomotive. The passenger cars are based on the Narragansett-style excursion cars used on the Disneyland Railroad and Walt Disney World Railroad, with guests facing forward. Each coach has a small door in each row of seats that swings inward as a safety precaution.

See also

Rail transport in Walt Disney Parks and Resorts

References

Bibliography

External links

1983 establishments in Japan
2 ft 6 in gauge railways in Japan
Adventureland (Disney)
Amusement rides introduced in 1983
Dinosaurs in amusement parks
Heritage railways in Japan
Rail transport in Walt Disney Parks and Resorts
Railways of amusement parks in Japan
Tokyo Disneyland
Walt Disney Parks and Resorts attractions
Western (genre) amusement rides